Donuca xanthopyga is a species of moth of the family Noctuidae first described by Turner in 1909. It is found in the Australian state of Queensland.

References

Catocalina